Miss International 1984, the 24th Miss International pageant, was held on October 30, 1984 at the Kanagawa Prefectural Civic Hall in Yokohama, Japan. Ilma Urrutia earned Guatemala's first Miss International crown.

Results

Placements

Contestants

  - Barbara Francisca Kendell
  - Isabella Haller
  - An Van Den Broeck
  - Maria Cristina Gómez
  - Anna Glitz
  - Terry Lee Bailey
  - Silvia Maritza Yunda Charry
  - Mónica Zamora Velasco
  - Catharina Clausen
  - Karen Lesley Moore
  - Tiina Johanna Kaarina Laine
  - Corinne Terrason
  - Petra Geisler
  - Vivian Galanopoulou
  - Eleanor Benavente Umagat
  - Ilma Julieta Urrutia Chang
  - Rosalie van Breemen
  - Myrtice Elitha Hyde
  - Debbie Tsui Yuen-Mei
  - Gudlaug Stella Brynjolfsdóttir
  - Nalanda Ravindra Bhandari
  - Karen Curran
  - Pazit Cohen
  - Monica Gallo
  - Kelly Anne O'Brien
  - Junko Ueno
  - Kim Kyoung-ree
  - Jennifer Foong Sim Yong
  - Adriana Margarita González García
  - Trudy Ann West
  - Mary Celeste Sasakura Mendiola
  - Monika Lien
  - Vielka Mariana Marciac
  - Maria Bella de la Peña Nachor
  - Teresa Alendouro Pinto
  - Siobhan Fowl
  - Wong Leng
  - Soledad Marisol Pila Balanza
  - Gunilla Maria Kohlström
  - Gabrielle Amrein
  - Pranee Meawnuam
  - Gamze Tuhadaroglu
  - Sandra Lee Percival
  - Miriam Leyderman Eppel
  - Jane Ann Riley
  - Ngalula Wa Ntumba Bagisha

Notes

Did not compete
  - Fabiana Gómez
  - Sandra Beauchamp Roche

1984
1984 in Japan
1984 beauty pageants
Beauty pageants in Japan